Junko Onishi may refer to:
Junko Onishi (swimmer)
Junko Onishi (musician)